NU 107 (DWNU) was a radio station in Mega Manila that played mainly rock music. It was owned by Progressive Broadcasting Corporation. The station's last studio was located at the ground floor of AIC Gold Tower, F. Ortigas Jr. Road, Ortigas Center, Pasig.

NU 107 signed off for the last time a little past midnight on November 8, 2010. The station was reformatted and renamed 107.5 Win Radio (ultimately becoming Wish 107.5).

History

Late 1980s
NU 107 first hit the airwaves on October 31, 1987, being one of two FM stations (the other being Power 105 BM FM (now Q Radio 105.1)) that played the latest new wave and punk hits during that time. It was also known as the station that inherited the format of WXB 102 (now 102.7 Star FM), which went off air a few months before the birth of NU 107. Meanwhile, the other rock station on the Metro Manila FM bandwidth, Boss Radio DZRJ 100.3 (now 100.3 RJFM), usually played classic rock of the '60s and '70s unlike NU 107 and Power 105 BM FM.
Banker Atom Henares started the radio station in 1987, playing new wave music for about six weeks on the 107.5 MHz frequency. After that, when the station's tagline "The Home of New Rock" was aired and their telephone number was announced, the station's telephone rang for three hours straight. President Corazon Aquino issued an executive order requiring radio stations to air at least three Original Pilipino Music (OPM) hourly; the station asked for contributions from listeners, under the program "In the Raw". The station also instituted the NU Rock Awards, in which the inaugural edition had guests such as Joey Pepe Smith, Freddie Aguilar and Grace Nono, to honor the country's best rock musicians. With Henares were Mike Pedero, who would later become its vice-president, and Cris Hermosisima who would later become the station manager. Back then, its studios were located at the Solidbank Building (now PSBank Center) along Paseo De Roxas in Makati.

1990s
In the 1990s, NU 107 mainly played American grunge and alternative rock hits from bands like Nirvana, Soundgarden, Pearl Jam and Silverchair. Also, during that decade, the station played demos and songs from Filipino rock bands, most of which were unsigned. As a result, bands such as The Youth, Yano, Razorback, Wolfgang, Eraserheads, AfterImage and Rivermaya, among others, became highly popular as the Pinoy rock scene surged the airwaves. Later, the station formulated the show "In the Raw", which featured demos from amateur bands.

In 1994, NU 107 held its first NU Rock Awards, which honored the country's most distinguished rock artists every year. The NU Rock Awards was held annually until 2010.

Furthermore, NU 107 had a music chart show, the "Midnight Countdown", which was held every Sunday midnight, charting the top 12 rock songs every week. Among the most popular hits that topped the "Midnight Countdown" were "Paris" by Filipino band Chicosci (which lasted 52 weeks) and "Shimmer" by American band Fuel (which lasted for a year).

Among the popular radio shows on NU 107 during the '90s were "The Crossroads", which played blues and classic rock; "Euro Rock", which played European rock music; "Against the Flow", which played Christian rock; and "Not Radio", which played foreign indie music; and the morning show "Zach and Joey in the Morning".
By 1994, NU 107 emerged as the number one in the AB market, or the upscale listeners, among commercial radio stations in Metro Manila at 32% according to the Radio Research Council, Inc. The station also opened their fourth station in Davao City to go along with its flagship Metro Manila station, and Cebu City and Iloilo City stations in the Visayas.

This period saw NU 107 introducing a number of innovations in the Philippine music scene. Another innovation was the idea of the NU 107 Pocket Concerts, which were concerts held in various malls. Prior to this, concerts of that size were simply not held. They became relatively common after the success of the first NU 107 Pocket Concerts.

2000s
NU 107 then played nu metal music (popularly known among Filipino rock fans as the "kupaw" subgenre) popularized by Filipino bands Slapshock, Greyhoundz, Queso (formerly Cheese), and Chicosci (formerly Chico Science); and foreign bands like the Deftones, Korn, Limp Bizkit and Slipknot. Later, the station popularized Cebuano rock bands like Urbandub, Frank!, Sheila and the Insects, Junior Kilat, and Franco.

Meanwhile, in 2001, the Progressive Broadcasting Corporation aired the TV counterpart of NU 107, UNTV 37 (now UNTV News and Rescue, which eventually became the first public service channel in Philippine Television), on the free UHF band. The TV station, now operated and managed by Breakthrough and Milestones Productions International, an affiliate of a religious group known for its program Ang Dating Daan, the Members Church of God International (MCGI), used to play music videos of songs played on NU 107. It also aired the TV version of "In The Raw" and clips from past NU Rock Awards and NU 107 events like the Summer Shebang, Pocket Concerts and Party Monsters on the Loose.

For a while, the station popularized the emo rock subgenre, playing foreign hits from foreign bands like The Used and My Chemical Romance and local emo bands like Typecast and Blue Boy Bites Back. In the late 2000s, indie pop became popular on the station with the rise of Filipino indie pop bands Up Dharma Down, Taken by Cars, Pedicab and Narda.

Also in this decade, bands who were first featured on "In The Raw" like Sugarfree, Twisted Halo, Itchyworms and Silent Sanctuary rose to mainstream fame.

In 2005, the "Midnight Countdown" was transformed into the "Stairway to Seven", NU 107's daily countdown of the top seven most popular rock hits.

NU 107 also introduced an array of shows, like "Dredd at the Control", "Time Bomb", "Metal Madness", "Let's Fun", "University Rock", "Rock Ed Radio", "Pirate Satellite" and "The Room".

In 2007, the station celebrated its 20th anniversary with the 2007 NU Rock Awards. Hermosisima, the station's network operations head, remarked to the Philippine Daily Inquirer that the station will continue on its current format "and we exert every possible means to keep it alive, especially in relation to the local rock scene."

Final transmission
Former DJ Joyce Ann Burton Titular, popularly known as Jaedee, disclosed on her blog that NU 107 would close down in 2011, reportedly due to financial constraints (brought about by lack of advertisers' support) and poor ratings (as it struggled against other stations such as 90.7 Love Radio, IFM 93.9, Barangay LS 97.1 and Tambayan 101.9), which was later confirmed at the 2010 NU Rock Awards. On October 27, 2010, the Manila Bulletin reported that the station would sign off on November 7, 2010. Musicians and the recording industry "expressed sadness over developments regarding the station."

During the 2010 NU Rock Awards on October 29, Hermosisima announced that it was going to be the last Rock Awards, and that the station will be reformatted and injected with new capital.

On the week leading up to the final day, a Facebook page was set up to formally organize the final day of broadcasts. More than a thousand fans responded to the call. Barangay officials in Brgy. San Antonio in Pasig were informed of the matter beforehand.

On Sunday, November 7, speakers were set up outside NU 107's studio where a crowd had gathered carrying candles as a sign of support. The crowd, which included musicians and supporters, stayed at NU 107's studios at Ortigas Center, Pasig. Some of the crowd wrote on a wall their sadness and memories, as well as their wishes for the station and its staff. The final edition of "In the Raw" had rock bands Urbandub and Itchyworms performing live. The disc jockeys openly wept as they thanked the supporters during the station's final hour. Hermosisima was the last person on the microphone with the final words: "This has been NU 107, the Philippines' one and only Home of NU Rock... This is NU 107, we are signing off", with The Eraserheads' "Ang Huling El Bimbo" as the final song of the station. Outside the building, the crowd joined in with the last half of the song, with loud chanting following after the song had finished. NU 107 signed off on November 8, 12:05 a.m, after the usual sign-off notice and the Philippine national anthem "Lupang Hinirang", sung by everyone gathered inside the station and outside the building premises, especially the final line of the anthem, which was sung fortississimo in unison, thus marking the end of NU 107 after 23 years of broadcasting. Footage of this can be found on YouTube as well as on other websites, including commentary and analysis regarding the final day of broadcast.

"Lumapit" by Archipelago was the last song that stayed at the number 1 spot on the NU 107 "Stairway to Seven" charts before the station closed down after 23 years.

According to the Philippine Daily Inquirer, the new format had to imitate the format of various 'masa' stations to target listeners at the lower brackets of the socioeconomic scale. The new programming drew in more advertisers compared to the upscale market that NU 107 targeted.

Eventually in late June 2014, Breakthrough and Milestones Productions International (owned by broadcaster Daniel Razon) took over the management and broadcast operations of the station and switched to an adult contemporary format, and rebranded it as Wish 107.5. The other regional stations we're acquired by ZimZam Management under the branding Win Radio.

Legacy
As the "Home of New Rock", NU 107 is best remembered for popularizing new subgenres of both mainstream and underground rock music. Most Filipino rock bands that garnered mainstream success were also first heard on NU 107.

NU 107 also created the award-giving event for Filipino rock bands, the NU Rock Awards, where past winners of the awards had become or became household names in the Pinoy music scene.

Dig Radio
Several former NU 107 presenters later set up Dig Radio, an online radio station adopting NU 107's rock format.

NU Rock Awards

NU 107 hosted the annual NU Rock Awards from November 1994 until 2010. From being a simple gathering to honor the year's best rock artists, the event had grown into one of the most prestigious awards shows in the Philippines. The final Rock Awards was an invite-only event, as opposed to having tickets sold as during the previous iterations.

Shows
NU 107's program schedule before it signed off on November 7, 2010, included a lineup of notable specialized shows:
In the Raw (hosted by Francis Brew)
University Rock
Live & Raw with Bel and Joey (hosted by The Music Source's Bel Sayson and PULP Magazine's Joey Dizon)
The Crossroads (hosted by Captain Eddie)
Power Wheels Radio
The Ballad of the Times
Rock Ed Radio (hosted by Gang Badoy and Lourd de Veyra) - now on Jam 88.3
The Reel Score (hosted by Roanna)
The Magazine Show (hosted by Raya Mananquil and Mark Dimalanta)
Pirate Satellite
Against the Flow (hosted by Jordan Escusa) - now on Edge Radio
The Room
Upswing (Joystick Jay and Trish)
Stairway to Seven
Flipchart
Remote Control Weekend
Dread at the Control (hosted by Papadom Gamboa)

Notable shows that ended their run prior to the sign-off included:
Halikinu Radio
The Midnight Countdown
Not Radio
Zack and Joey in the Morning
Club Retro (hosted by Mondo C. Castro originally hosted by Jelly Jean) 
Euro-Rock (hosted by Mondo C. Castro)
Between Planets (hosted by Mondo C. Castro)

PBC radio stations
The following provincial stations carried the Manila broadcast of NU 107.

Compilation albums of NU 107.5
Rockathon (PolyEast Records, 2009)
Ugat: The Best Of Pinoy Folk Rock (Vicor Music Corp., 2008)
Live & Raw: Underground 2 (Warner Music Philippines, 2007)
Red Horse Muziklaban 2006 (Viva Records, 2006)
Supersize Rock (Warner Music Philippines, 2004)
NU Rock: The Album  (PolyEast Records, 1988)

See also 
Progressive Broadcasting Corporation
Wish 107.5
UNTV News and Rescue
Radyo La Verdad 1350
NU Rock Awards
Wish 107.5 Music Awards

References

Progressive Broadcasting Corporation
Radio stations in Metro Manila
Radio stations established in 1987
Radio stations disestablished in 2010
Rock radio stations
New wave radio stations
Defunct radio stations in Metro Manila